Jajan may refer to:
 Jajan, East Azerbaijan (جاجان - Jājān)
 Jajan, Mazandaran (جاجن - Jājan)